Trachelas oreophilus is a species of spiders of the genus Trachelas. It is native to India and Sri Lanka.

See also
 List of Trachelidae species

References

Spiders described in 1906
Trachelidae
Arthropods of India
Spiders of Asia